Panamukkumpally sree Sastha Temple is a Hindu temple situated in Thrissur City of Kerala, India. Lord Ayyappan is the main deity of the temple. The temple is a participant in the Thrissur Pooram every year.

References

Shiva temples in Kerala
Hindu temples in Thrissur
Thrissur Pooram